Ege Çubukçu (born 24 October 1983) is a Turkish rapper and songwriter.

Discography 
 2005: Bir Gün
 2008: Bir De Baktım
 2012: Parti İstanbul

Digital albums 
2009: "Asit Yağmuru Remixler"
2010: "Sex On Da Beat"
2011: "Funky Sh*t"

All albums 

 2005: "Bir Gün" 
 2005: "Bir Gün" (2. Versiyon)
 2013: "Yolumuz Ayrı"
 2014: "Kanatlanıp Uçacaksın"
 2012: "Parti İstanbul"
 2016: "Reçete"
 2017: "Gece Gelen Sıkıntı"
 2018: "Derya"
 2018: "Çalkala"

Other albums 

 2000: "Hayatını Yaşa"
 2001: "Bi Yatakta Bi Ayakta"
 2002: "KOH 001 – BOD 002"
 2003: "Hashna Fishne"
 2004: "Ağır Darbe – Beddua"
 2005: "Alın Size Bandrol – Bürokrasiye Rağmen"
 2006: "Nöbetteyim Gelicem"

References 

Living people
1983 births
Turkish rappers
Turkish lyricists
21st-century Turkish singers
Musicians from İzmir